Qiqihar Medical University is an institution for higher education, founded in 1946 and located in Qiqihar city of Heilongjiang province in northeast China.

History and Today
Qiqihar Medical University (QMU), located in the hometown of world-famous red-crowned cranes, stands by the scenic Nenjiang River and is a regular university of Heilongjiang Province. Founded in 1946, the University has a history of more than 65 years.

Staff
Currently, QMU boasts a staff of 3,489 including 856 professors as well as associate professors and more than 66.8% teachers with master's degrees. The number of enrollment is more than 15,000. The undergraduate education program offers 25 specialties and disciplinary orientations covering the full spectrum of medicine as well as four other disciplines: science, engineering, law and managing.

The University possesses 26 research institutes and academic associations, in which there are the Post-doctoral Research Workstations, the Research and Development Lab and the Key Constructing Lab of Provincial Universities. In the past five years, the University has undertaken 458 scientific research projects at different levels. More than 2,000 academic papers, works and textbooks have been issued and published according to 2008 and 2009 annual statistical report on technology fruits, the technology fruits registration number of our university amounts to 53 and 68.

Facilities
The Library of QMU has a collection of 800,000 volumes of books and provides CD-ROM Retrieval System and Electronic Reading Section. 3 Journals are sponsored by the University— Journal of Qiqihar Medical University, Chinese Modern Nursing, and Nervous Diseases and Mental Hygiene, which are issued domestically and abroad. Chinese Modern Nursing is the national publication and the others are the provincial publication. The headquarters of the Periodical Press is located in Beijing. Besides, the University has already established the campus network system with 3,970 kinds of online teaching resources.

The University has 9 affiliated hospitals and 27 teaching and training hospitals. The beds in the affiliated hospital can meet the needs of clinical teaching and practice to the fullest extent.

International Cooperations
QMU lays great emphasis on exchange and cooperation, and has established friendly interscholastic relationships with many universities nationally, regionally and internationally, such as Union Medical University, Kanazawa Medical University of Japan, Russia Chita State Medical College, Our Lady of Fatima University of the Philippines, Emilio Aguinaldo College of the Philippines, University of Cape Town and Assumption University of Thailand etc.,. Meanwhile, the University has recruited foreign teachers and enrolled international students, some of whom are from South Asia. Teachers and students of QMU have been sent to go to the Philippines for further study.

References

Educational institutions established in 1946
Universities and colleges in Heilongjiang
Qiqihar
1946 establishments in China